In graph theory, a biconnected graph is a connected and "nonseparable" graph, meaning that if any one vertex were to be removed, the graph will remain connected. Therefore a biconnected graph has no articulation vertices.

The property of being 2-connected is equivalent to biconnectivity, except that the complete graph of two vertices is usually not regarded as 2-connected.

This property is especially useful in maintaining a graph with a two-fold redundancy, to prevent disconnection upon the removal of a single edge (or connection).

The use of biconnected graphs is very important in the field of networking (see Network flow), because of this property of redundancy.

Definition 
A biconnected undirected graph is a connected graph that is not broken into disconnected pieces by deleting any single vertex (and its incident edges).

A biconnected directed graph is one such that for any two vertices v and w there are two directed paths from v to w which have no vertices in common other than v and w.

Examples

See also
Biconnected component

References 
 Eric W. Weisstein. "Biconnected Graph." From MathWorld—A Wolfram Web Resource. http://mathworld.wolfram.com/BiconnectedGraph.html
 Paul E. Black, "biconnected graph", in Dictionary of Algorithms and Data Structures [online], Paul E. Black, ed., U.S. National Institute of Standards and Technology. 17 December 2004. (accessed TODAY) Available from: https://xlinux.nist.gov/dads/HTML/biconnectedGraph.html

External links 
 The tree of the biconnected components Java implementation in the jBPT library (see BCTree class).

Graph families
Graph connectivity